The 2013–14 Cornwall/Devon League, known for sponsorship reasons as the Tribute Cornwall/Devon League was the twenty-seventh full season of rugby union within the Cornwall/Devon League, and consisted of seven teams from Devon and six teams from Cornwall. Exeter University, the champions, lost only one match and finished in their highest ever league placing. Tiverton came second and both teams are promoted to Tribute Western Counties West for 2014–15 season. Newquay Hornets and Veor, who won only two matches and promoted the previous season, are both relegated to Tribute Cornwall 1.

Participating teams and locations
The 2013–14 Tribute Cornwall/Devon League consists of thirteen teams, six from Cornwall and seven from Devon; each team playing the others twice, home and away. The season started on 14 September 2013 and ended on 26 April 2014. Joining the nine teams who continued from last season were Exeter Saracens and Honiton, both relegated from Tribute Western Counties West last season. Honiton spent only one season in the higher league having been promoted from this league in 2011–12. Two teams were promoted from the two feeder leagues; Exeter University from Tribute Devon 1 and in their first season at this level, and Veor from Tribute Cornwall 1, who were relegated from this league in 2011–12.

League table

See also
 English rugby union system
 Rugby union in Cornwall

References

Cornwall1
Tribute Cornwall/Devon